Peter Ross may refer to:

 Pete Ross, a fictional character appearing in DC Comics
 Peter Ross (cricketer) (born 1992), Scottish cricketer

See also
Peter Ross-Edwards (1922–2012), Australian politician